Stanton Gittens (4 May 1911 – 20 April 1994) was a Barbadian cricketer. He played in eleven first-class matches for the Barbados cricket team from 1934 to 1945.

See also
 List of Barbadian representative cricketers

References

External links
 

1911 births
1994 deaths
Barbadian cricketers
Barbados cricketers
People from Saint Michael, Barbados